Eiryn Gwyne "Gwyn" Davies (23 June 1908  – 14 July 1992) was a Welsh dual-code international rugby union and professional rugby league footballer who played in the 1920s and 1930s.

Background
Davies was born in Aberkenfig, Wales, he died aged 84 in Wigan, Greater Manchester, England.

Playing career

International honours
Gwyn Davies won 3 caps for Wales (RU) in 1932–1935 while at Cardiff RFC in 1928 against France, in 1929 against England, and in 1930 against Scotland, and won 3 caps, all against England, for Wales (RL) while at Wigan.

Gwyn Davies was selected for Great Britain while at Wigan for the 1936 Great Britain Lions tour of Australia and New Zealand.

Championship final appearances
Gwyn Davies played left-, i.e. number 4, and scored a try in Wigan's 15–3 victory over Salford in the Championship Final during the 1933–34 season at Wilderspool Stadium, Warrington on Saturday 28 April 1934 .

County Cup Final appearances
Gwyn Davies played left-, i.e. number 4, and scored a try in Wigan's 7–15 defeat by Salford in the 1935–36 Lancashire County Cup Final during the 1935–36 season at Wilderspool Stadium, Warrington on Saturday 19 October 1935, and played left-, i.e. number 4, in the 10–7 victory over Salford in the 1938–39 Lancashire County Cup Final during the 1938–39 season at Station Road, Swinton, on Saturday 22 October 1938.

Notable tour matches
Gwyn Davies played left-, i.e. number 4, and scored a try in Wigan's 30–27 victory over France at Central Park, Wigan, on Saturday 10 March 1934.

Note
Davies' middle name is stated as Gwyn on rugbyleagueproject.org, scrum.com, and wru.co.uk, stated as Gwynne on wigan.rlfans.com, and stated as Gwyne on freebmd.org.uk.

References

External links
!Great Britain Statistics at englandrl.co.uk (statistics currently missing due to not having appeared for both Great Britain, and England)
Statistics at wigan.rlfans.com

1908 births
1992 deaths
Cardiff RFC players
Dual-code rugby internationals
Great Britain national rugby league team players
Rugby league players from Bridgend County Borough
Rugby league centres
Rugby union players from Aberkenfig
Rugby union wings
Wales international rugby union players
Wales national rugby league team players
Welsh rugby league players
Welsh rugby union players
Wigan Warriors players